Desley Brooks was a politician in Oakland, California. She served as a Councilmember on the Oakland City Council from 2002 to 2018.  In January 2011, Brooks was also inaugurated as the vice mayor of Oakland, California.

Early life and education 
Brooks was born in New Orleans, and she grew up in Los Angeles and Seattle.  She holds a B.A. in political science from University of Washington and a J.D. from Seattle University.  Prior to her service on the city council, Brooks served Chief of Staff to Alameda County Supervisor Keith Carson.

Council career 
Brooks was first elected to the council in 2002, taking the seat formerly held by Moses Mayne.

In 2002, Brooks listed endorsements by a number of individuals, including sitting city council member Nancy Nadel and civil rights attorney Dan Siegel.

In 2008 Brooks sued San Francisco Chronicle for libel.  That case, Brooks v. San Francisco Chronicle, was ultimately dismissed.

In 2010 Brooks spoke on the one-year anniversary of the BART Police shooting of Oscar Grant.

In 2011 Council member Brooks was among the protestors sleeping in tents on the inaugural night of the Occupy Oakland encampment.

In 2012, Brooks put forward a public safety proposal calling for, among other things, better lighting in high crime areas of the city.

In 2017, with the pending adult use legalization of marijuana in California, Brooks lobbied equity amendments in the marijuana permit process that ensures half of all marijuana permits be given to individuals that were formerly convicted of marijuana related offenses or have lived in police beats that were disproportionately affected by the War on Drugs. The new system would also encourage general applicants to partner with equity applicants and provide either free rent or real estate for better priority in the permitting process.

In 2017, Brooks was found liable for $3.75 million for assaulting former Black Panther, Elaine Brown.

In 2018, Brooks faced four challengers and was defeated by Loren Taylor, a biomedical engineer and management consultant, who won with 64.3% of the vote after 5 rounds of ranked-choice voting.

References

External links
 Bio at Oakland City Council Website
 2008 profile of Brooks

Living people
Oakland City Council members
Year of birth missing (living people)
University of Washington College of Arts and Sciences alumni
Women city councillors in California
Seattle University School of Law alumni
21st-century American women